The 2019 Big Ten Men's Lacrosse Tournament was held May 2 and May 4 at HighPoint.com Stadium in Piscataway, New Jersey. The winner of the tournament received the Big Ten Conference's automatic bid to the 2019 NCAA Division I Men's Lacrosse Championship. Four teams from the Big Ten conference competed in the single elimination event. The seeds were determined based upon the teams' regular season conference record. Penn State won the tournament, beating Johns Hopkins 18-17.

Standings
Only the top four teams in the Big Ten Conference advanced to the Big Ten Conference Tournament.

Not including Big Ten Tournament and NCAA tournament results

Schedule

Bracket
Highpoint.com Stadium – Piscataway, New Jersey

Awards

 MVP: Mac O'Keefe, Penn State
 All-Tournament Team
 Joey Epstein, Johns Hopkins
 Patrick Foley, Johns Hopkins
 Cole Williams, Johns Hopkins
 Danny Dolan, Maryland
 Grant Ament, Penn State
 Nick Cardile, Penn State
 Colby Kneese, Penn State
 Mac O'Keefe, Penn State
 Chris Sabia, Penn State
 Ryan Gallagher, Rutgers

References

External links
 2019 Big Ten Men's Lacrosse Tournament Central
 Boxscore (Final)
 Boxscore (Semifinal: Penn State vs Rutgers)
 Boxscore (Semifinal: Johns Hopkins vs Maryland)

2019 NCAA Division I men's lacrosse season
Big Ten Conference Men's Lacrosse
Big Ten men's lacrosse tournament